Tinissa transversella is a moth of the family Tineidae. It was described by Francis Walker in 1864. It is found on Borneo.

References

Moths described in 1864
Scardiinae